Tenedos is a spider genus of the family Zodariidae. It has around 72 species from Central and South America.

The genus is possibly paraphyletic; it forms an evolutionary lineage with the genus Ishania, but which species should be placed in which genus is not completely resolved.

Species
, the World Spider Catalog accepted the following extant species:

Tenedos andes Jocqué & Baert, 2002 – Colombia
Tenedos asteronoides Jocqué & Baert, 2002 – Ecuador
Tenedos ayo Martínez, Brescovit & Cuervo, 2022 – Colombia
Tenedos banos Jocqué & Baert, 2002 – Ecuador
Tenedos barronus (Chamberlin, 1925) – Panama
Tenedos brescoviti Jocqué & Baert, 2002 – Brazil
Tenedos calebi Martínez, Brescovit & Cuervo, 2022 – Colombia
Tenedos capote Jocqué & Baert, 2002 – Colombia
Tenedos caqueta Martínez, Brescovit & Cuervo, 2022 – Colombia
Tenedos carlosprestesi Candiani, Bonaldo & Brescovit, 2008 – Brazil
Tenedos carlosprietoi Martínez, Brescovit & Cuervo, 2022 – Colombia
Tenedos certus (Jocqué & Ubick, 1991) – Costa Rica, Panama
Tenedos choco Martínez, Brescovit & Cuervo, 2022 – Colombia
Tenedos cofan Martínez, Brescovit & Cuervo, 2022 – Colombia
Tenedos convexus Jocqué & Baert, 2002 – Venezuela
Tenedos cufodontii (Reimoser, 1939) – Costa Rica, Panama
Tenedos dankittipakuli Martínez, Brescovit & Cuervo, 2022 – Colombia
Tenedos eberhardi Martínez, Brescovit & Cuervo, 2022 – Colombia
Tenedos eduardoi (Mello-Leitão, 1925) – Brazil
Tenedos equatorialis Jocqué & Baert, 2002 – Ecuador
Tenedos estari Jocqué & Baert, 2002 – Peru
Tenedos fartilis Jocqué & Baert, 2002 – Ecuador
Tenedos figaro Jocqué & Baert, 2002 – Ecuador
Tenedos garoa Candiani, Bonaldo & Brescovit, 2008 – Brazil
Tenedos grandis Jocqué & Baert, 2002 – Panama, Ecuador
Tenedos griswoldi Martínez, Brescovit & Cuervo, 2022 – Colombia
Tenedos guacharos Martínez, Brescovit & Cuervo, 2022 – Colombia
Tenedos henrardi Martínez, Brescovit & Cuervo, 2022 – Colombia
Tenedos hirsutus (Mello-Leitão, 1941) – Brazil
Tenedos hoeferi Jocqué & Baert, 2002 – Brazil
Tenedos honduras Jocqué & Baert, 2002 – Honduras
Tenedos humboldti Martínez, Brescovit & Cuervo, 2022 – Colombia
Tenedos inca Jocqué & Baert, 2002 – Peru
Tenedos inflatus Jocqué & Baert, 2002 – Peru
Tenedos infrarmatus Jocqué & Baert, 2002 – Brazil
Tenedos jocquei Quijano-Cuervo & Galvis, 2018 – Colombia
Tenedos juninus Jocqué & Baert, 2002 – Peru
Tenedos lautus O. Pickard-Cambridge, 1897 (type species) – Guatemala
Tenedos ligulatus Jocqué & Baert, 2002 – Colombia
Tenedos luzmarinae Martínez, Brescovit & Cuervo, 2022 – Colombia
Tenedos macagual Martínez, Brescovit & Cuervo, 2022 – Colombia
Tenedos major (Keyserling, 1891) – Brazil
Tenedos marquetones Martínez, Brescovit & Cuervo, 2022 – Colombia
Tenedos medina Martínez, Brescovit & Cuervo, 2022 – Colombia
Tenedos mesa Martínez, Brescovit & Cuervo, 2022 – Colombia
Tenedos microlaminatus Jocqué & Baert, 2002 – Peru
Tenedos minor (Keyserling, 1891) – Brazil
Tenedos nancyae Candiani, Bonaldo & Brescovit, 2008 – Peru
Tenedos narinensis Martínez, Brescovit & Cuervo, 2022 – Colombia
Tenedos neitai Martínez, Brescovit & Cuervo, 2022 – Colombia
Tenedos parinca Jocqué & Baert, 2002 – Peru
Tenedos peckorum Jocqué & Baert, 2002 – Colombia
Tenedos pensilvania Martínez, Brescovit & Cuervo, 2022 – Colombia
Tenedos persulcatus Jocqué & Baert, 2002 – Ecuador
Tenedos piedecuesta Martínez, Brescovit & Cuervo, 2022 – Colombia
Tenedos procreator Jocqué & Baert, 2002 – Brazil
Tenedos quadrangulatus Jocqué & Baert, 2002 – Peru
Tenedos quinquangulatus Jocqué & Baert, 2002 – Peru
Tenedos quipile Martínez, Brescovit & Cuervo, 2022 – Colombia
Tenedos reygeli Jocqué & Baert, 2002 – Brazil
Tenedos santarosa Martínez, Brescovit & Cuervo, 2022 – Colombia
Tenedos serrulatus Jocqué & Baert, 2002 – Ecuador
Tenedos sumaco Jocqué & Baert, 2002 – Ecuador
Tenedos tama Martínez, Brescovit & Cuervo, 2022 – Colombia
Tenedos tatama Martínez, Brescovit & Cuervo, 2022 – Colombia
Tenedos ticuna Martínez, Brescovit & Cuervo, 2022 – Colombia
Tenedos trilobatus Jocqué & Baert, 2002 – Colombia
Tenedos ufoides Jocqué & Baert, 2002 – Venezuela
Tenedos ultimus Jocqué & Baert, 2002 – Colombia
Tenedos venezolanus Jocqué & Baert, 2002 – Venezuela
Tenedos wayuu Martínez, Brescovit & Cuervo, 2022 – Colombia
Tenedos yurayaco Martínez, Brescovit & Cuervo, 2022 – Colombia

References

Zodariidae
Araneomorphae genera
Spiders of South America
Spiders of Central America